Posht Tang-e Kordali (also Romanized as Posht Tang-e Kord‘alī; also known as Posht Tang and Qarīyeh-ye Posht Tang) is a village in Miyankuh-e Sharqi Rural District, Mamulan District, Pol-e Dokhtar County, Lorestan Province, Iran. At the 2006 census, its population was 60, in 14 families.

References 

Towns and villages in Pol-e Dokhtar County